Vest-Agder Museum Kristiansand or simply Kristiansand Museum (formerly Vest-Agder Fylkesmuseum) was founded in 1903 and is located in Kristiansand, Norway. Kristiansand Museum consists of a main building with collections and 40 old buildings, grouped by where they previously stood.

Exhibits
Setesdaltunet consists of buildings from Valle and Bykle in Aust-Agder County, containing houses for living, stabbur, sauna and barns. The oldest buildings date from the middle of the 17th century. The farm shows how the housing and living conditions developed in Setesdal until 1920.
Vest-Agdertunet consists of farmhouse, storehouse, barn/stable, barn and schoolhouse from Eiken in Hægebostad municipality Vest-Agder County, originally built in the period 1859-1875
 Bygaden  (the town street) consists of houses, taken from town centre Kvadraturen in Kristiansand. The collection includes general store, workshops and houses for living with interiors, time typical for the late 19th century.
Mini city is a miniature model of Kvadraturen, the city centre of Kristiansand, as the city appeared in the 1880s and 1890s. There is also a model of the former Kristiansand Cathedral which burned to the ground in 1880. "Mini-builders" is a group of enthusiasts who have built the model as a hobby.
Refugees cabin: Near the main building is a cabin that was used by resistance fighters on the run from Gestapo during World War II.

Vest-Agder-museet IKS
Kristiansand Museum forms part of Vest-Agder-museet IKS which was established as a result of a consolidation in 2006-07. Vest-Agder-museet IKS  currently consists of  several geographical departments: Flekkefjord museum, Lista museum, Sjølingstad Uldvarefabrik, Mandal museum, Kristiansand museum (formerly Vest-Agder Fylkesmuseum), Gimle Gård, Setesdalsbanen, Kristians kanonmuseum and SS Hestmanden.
Vest-Agder-museet IKS  is organized as an inter-municipal company. All the municipalities in the former county of Vest-Agder county as well as Aust-Agder County Municipality share ownership.

Gallery

References

External links 
 Vest Agder Museum, Kristiansand  official website  
Vest-Agder-museet IKS official website

Open-air museums in Norway
Tourism in Kristiansand
Museums in Kristiansand
Museums established in 1903
1903 establishments in Norway